Eurylomia ochreata is a moth of the subfamily Arctiinae first described by Herbert Druce in 1885. It is found in Honduras.

References

Lithosiini